Geraldo is an American daytime television tabloid talk show hosted by Geraldo Rivera that aired in syndication from September 7, 1987, to June 12, 1998. The last two seasons aired under the title The Geraldo Rivera Show.

The series was a production of Investigative News Group and distributed by Tribune Entertainment. For its first three seasons, Paramount Domestic Television served as co-distributor. For its final two seasons, King World Productions assisted Tribune as co-distributor.

Controversy
On November 3, 1988, an episode involving white supremacy, Skinheads Against Racial Prejudice, black activists, and Jewish activists was aired. A confrontation between John Metzger (the son of Tom Metzger) and Roy Innis (in which Metzger goaded Innis by referring to him as "Uncle Tom") led to Innis walking over showing signs of aggression and forcefully grabbing Metzger by the neck after Metzger stood up, and subsequently, a full-scale brawl broke out. Audience members, several stage hands, and Rivera himself got involved. In the process, Rivera was struck in the face by a chair and wound up with a nasal fracture. He did not press charges, saying he did not wish to be "tied up with the roaches", and also claiming "if there ever was a case of deserved violence, this was it". The ratings for this show increased as news of the fight attracted attention to the episode even before it aired.

In August 1992, Rivera scuffled with KKK members again at a Klan rally in Janesville, Wisconsin. Rivera suffered cuts and a bite to his left thumb.

Parodies/In popular culture
The animation studio Marvel Productions featured a character named Hector Ramirez throughout a number of their cartoons, including Inhumanoids, RoboCop, GI Joe, Jem and the Holograms and Transformers. Ramirez was the host of the fictional news show 20 Questions and was usually portrayed as publicity seeking and often antagonistic towards the main characters. Writer Buzz Dixon, the character's creator, has commented that he was intended to be a satire of Geraldo Rivera.
The 1989 film UHF, starring "Weird Al" Yankovic, parodies Geraldo, including the infamous 1988 brawl.
"What Comes Around", a song by the Beastie Boys from their 1989 album Paul's Boutique, features the lyric, "You're all mixed up like pasta primavera/Yo why'd you throw that chair at Geraldo Rivera?"
The season 2 opener of Saved by the Bell features Kelly's dream sequence in which Screech Powers (Dustin Diamond) is now Geraldo Screech at Bayside, which takes place at The Max.
The Family Guy episode "Fifteen Minutes of Shame", which featured the Griffins appearing on a talk show, parodied the infamous 1988 brawl by having Peter shout "Who are you calling 'Uncle Tom'?!" and throwing a chair.
In a season five episode of Empty Nest titled "Dirty Harry", Rivera appears as himself and mocks the brawl. In the episode, Harry, Carol, and Charlie appear on the talk show; during their appearance, Harry inadvertently hits Geraldo in the nose with a coffee mug.
In the Perfect Strangers Season 4 episode "The Gift of the Mypiot", when a character attempts to use a Christmas gift to hit another character, Balki intervenes, saying, "This is not Geraldo!"
In the 1990 demonic horror movie The First Power, a Catholic priest says about the Satanic themed murders in their city (Los Angeles), "Next thing you know, we'll all be on Geraldo", in reference to his October, 1988 special on Satanism.
In the 1991 film Thelma & Louise, the two title characters mention not wanting "to end up on the Geraldo Show" concerning their criminal exploits.

References

External links

Episodes publicly available at Geraldo's website

 

1987 American television series debuts
1998 American television series endings
1980s American television talk shows
1990s American television talk shows
English-language television shows
First-run syndicated television programs in the United States
Television series by Tribune Entertainment
Television series by King World Productions